Oti-Kéran National Park is located in the north of Togo, in the Kara area. There is only one road going through this area. Not many tourists visit Togo as the main national parks are more accessible in Ghana.

Social impact

The Oti-Kéran National Park belongs to a network of nature reserves in northern Togo that has been originally considerably expanded since the 1960s. These actions were undertaken without consent and participation of the local population. Instead of gaining income from tourism and other business opportunities potentially linked to the national parks, people were removed from their land and agricultural developments were abandoned, resulting in an increase of poverty and even hunger. Additionally, wildlife - especially elephants - from the protected but not fenced areas caused damage to fields and crops in the surrounding communities.
This led to antipathy by the local population against the protected areas and the wildlife. During political turmoil in 1990 this hatred broke free by massive attacks against the protected areas and mass-slaughtering of animals, resulting in a major destruction of the environment.

Re-organisation since 1999

As a result of widespread destruction and human invasion into the protected areas, Togolese authorities reformed the park boundaries since 1999. Peripheral areas deemed too much destroyed to be re-naturalized have been excluded from the national park and officially deallocated for human development. This shrunk the size of the national park, now named the Oti-Kéran National Park, from 179550 to 69000 hectares. What remained is planned to form part of a future biosphere reserve, linked by the Oti-Mandouri National Park to the WAP (W, Arli, Pendjari) protected area system in Burkina Faso, Benin, and Niger. It is, however, still threatened by settlements, cotton-farming, charcoal production, and other human activities within the park boundaries.

Ecotourism

Ecotourism  was  quite  well-developed  in  the  Oti-Kéran  National  Park  before  1990.  A  South African  company  invested  in  tourism  infrastructure  (hotel,  road,  observation  platforms  etc.) and ecotourism created monthly revenues for protected area management in the order of 50-60 million CFA (U$100000-120000) in Oti-Kéran alone. At the time it was considered a regional model for protected area ecotourism development and photographs still exist of herds of elephants and other key tourist attractions in the Park. Today the entire infrastructure is ruined and the ecotourism sector has not really restarted in the area of Oti-Kéran after the long period of socio-political troubles. Very few regional tourists arrive from neighboring countries (WAP complex Niger, Burkina Faso, Benin), but there are no adequate facilities or accommodation in Togo to encourage them to stay longer. The national Ministry of Tourism is concentrating its efforts in the Plateau Region and considers it necessary for management of protected areas in the Oti-Keran / Oti-Mandouri Complex to be revitalized and for habitats and fauna to be re-established before ecotourism plans can be developed.

Fauna

The destructions of the 1990s resulted in a reduced faunal diversity of the Togolese national parks compared to those in neighbouring Burkina Faso and Benin. An assessment in 2008 listed the following species though stating that their status is uncertain:

Mammals

 African elephant (Loxodonta africana) - A common sighting and attraction during the 1980s, elephants were probably nearly extirpated in the 1990s. An aerial survey in 2003 failed to find elephants in the park. Today, sporadic occurrences of migrating individuals and groups are reported. An UNDP project from 2010 aims to reestablish a population of about 20 animals in the park.
 Olive baboon (Papio anubis)
 Tantalus monkey (Chlorocebus tantalus) - Often listed as Cercopithecus aethiops.
 Patas monkey (Erythrocebus patas) - The presence of this species was confirmed by an aerial survey in 2003.
 Kob (Kobus kob kob) - The presence of this species was confirmed by an aerial survey in 2003.
 Waterbuck (Kobus ellipsiprymnus defassa) - The presence of this species was confirmed by an aerial survey in 2003.
 Red-flanked duiker (Cephalophus rufilatus)
 Common duiker (Sylvicapra grimmia coronata) - The presence of this species was confirmed by an aerial survey in 2003.
 African buffalo (Synceros caffer brachyceros)
 Hippopotamus (Hippopotamus amphibius)
 Warthog (Phacochoerus africanus africanus) - The presence of this species was confirmed by an aerial survey in 2003.
 West African lion (Panthera leo senegalensis) - Individuals of the lion has been reported sporadically, for the last time in 2005. There is no permanent lion population in Togo.
 Crested porcupine (Hystrix cristata)
 Striped ground squirrel (Xerus (Euxerus) erythropus erythropus)
 Four-toed hedgehog (Atelerix albiventris)

Birds

About 214 species of birds have been recorded, including:

 Black crowned crane (Balearica pavonina)
 Goliath heron (Ardea goliath)
 Grey heron (Ardea cinerea)
 Pink-backed pelican (Pelecanus rufescens)
 Violet turaco (Musophaga violacea)
 Red-throated bee-eater (Merops bullocki)
 Bearded barbet (Lybius dubius)
 Pied-winged swallow (Hirundo leucosoma)
 Rufous cisticola (Cisticola rufus)
 Oriole warbler (Hypergerus atriceps)
 Blackcap babbler (Turdoides reinwardtii)
 Purple starling (Lamprotornis purpureus)
 Bronze-tailed starling (Lamprotornis chalcurus)
 White-crowned robin-chat (Cossypha albicapilla)
 White-fronted black chat (Myrmecocichla albifrons)
 Splendid sunbird (Cinnyris coccinigastrus)
 Heuglin's masked weaver (Ploceus heuglini)
 Red-winged pytilia (Pytilia phoenicoptera)
 Bar-breasted firefinch (Lagonosticta rufopicta)
 Black-faced firefinch (Lagonosticta larvata)
 Lavender waxbill (Estrilda caerulescens)
 Exclamatory paradise whydah (Vidua interjecta)
 Togo paradise whydah (Vidua togoensis)
 Brown-rumped bunting (Emberiza affinis)

Reptiles

 West African crocodile (Crocodylus suchus) - Formerly listed as nile crocodile (C. niloticus)

References

National parks of Togo
Ramsar sites in Togo